Hernar is an island in Øygarden municipality in Vestland county, Norway.  It is one of the northernmost islands in the Øygarden archipelago.  The  island is rocky and barren.  Most of the settlement is in one cluster on the southwestern part of the island along the small harbor area.  The eastern third of the island is uninhabited.

Hernar has about 15 permanent inhabitants and many holiday cabins. It is connected to the mainland via a passenger ferry service to the small island of Hellesøyna, just off the coast of Seløyna. The ferry service is operated by Bergen Nordhordland Rutelag.

See also
List of islands of Norway

References

Islands of Vestland
Øygarden